A Mike Sar is a 2013 Burmese romantic-comedy film, directed by Ko Zaw (Ar Yone Oo) starring Khant Si Thu, Soe Myat Thuzar, Thu Htoo San, Thinzar Wint Kyaw, Kyaw Kyaw Bo, Soe Pyae Thazin, Moe Aung Yin, Wutt Hmone Shwe Yi, Moe Moe (singer) and Nan Su Yati Soe.

Cast
Khant Si Thu as U Lin Khaung
Soe Myat Thuzar as Daw Khin Khin Kyawt
Thu Htoo San as Shwe Kyay Si
Thinzar Wint Kyaw as Zar Zar
Kyaw Kyaw Bo as Htun Nyunt
Soe Pyae Thazin as Pyae Pyae
Moe Aung Yin as Mandolin Lu
Wutt Hmone Shwe Yi as Hmone Hmone
Moe Moe (singer) as Banjo Lu
Nan Su Yati Soe as Yati
Aung Lwin as U Ba Htwar
Nwet Nwet San as Daw Sein Kyawt

References

2013 films
2010s Burmese-language films
Burmese romantic comedy films
Films shot in Myanmar
2013 romantic comedy films